Imre Csáky may refer to:

Imre Csáky (cardinal)
Imre Csáky (Minister of Foreign Affairs)